Leo Boix is an Argentine-British poet, translator and journalist based in the UK. He is the author of an English collection, Ballad of a Happy Immigrant (Chatto & Windus, 2021) and two Spanish collections, Un lugarpropio (2015) and Mar de noche (2017). Boix has won the Bart Wolffe Poetry Prize Award and the Keats-Shelley Prize for Poetry.

Biography 
Boix was born in Argentina and moved to the UK, aged twenty.

Writing 
In 2021, Boix's debut English collection, Ballad of a Happy Immigrant (Chatto & Windus, 2021), was selected by the Poetry Book Society as Wild Card Choice for Summer. Boix’s poetry has been included in several anthologies such as Ten: Poets of the New Generation (Bloodaxe, 2017), Why Poetry? (Verve Poetry Press, 2018), Un Nuevo Sol: British Latinx Writers (Flipped Eye, 2019), 100 Poems To Save The Earth (Seren, 2021) and The Best New British and Irish Poets Anthology 2019-2020 (The Black Group Press, 2021). His poetry was also published in magazines and journals such as Poetry, The Poetry Review, Modern Poetry in Translation, PNReview, The Rialto, Litro, Magma, Brittle Star, Letras Libres, South Bank Poetry, The Morning Star and The Laurel Review.

He co-directs Invisible Presence, a scheme to nurture young Latinx poets in the UK. Boix received the Bart Wolffe Poetry Prize Award in 2018 and the Keats-Shelly Prize in 2019. Since 2021, he has been a mentor on the Ledbury Poetry Critics scheme as part of the Centre for New and International Writing, University of Liverpool.

Boix was mentored on The Complete Works poets of colour mentoring scheme initiated by Bernardine Evaristo to redress representational invisibility. The scheme (2007-2017) was directed by Dr Natalie Teitler, during which time thirty poets were mentored.

Awards and honours 

 2018: Bart Wolffe Poetry Prize Award
 2019: Keats-Shelly Prize
 2021: The Charles Causley International Poetry Competition (Second Prize)
 2021: Selected for Wild Card Choice for Summer by the Poetry Book Society

References 

British poets

Year of birth missing (living people)
Living people